Mont Noble (2,673 m) is a mountain of the Swiss Pennine Alps, overlooking the Val de Réchy in the canton of Valais.

References

External links
 Mont Noble on Hikr

Mountains of the Alps
Mountains of Switzerland
Mountains of Valais
Two-thousanders of Switzerland